P. nigricans may refer to:
 Padogobius nigricans, the Arno goby, a fish species of fish endemic to Italy
 Pardirallus nigricans, the blackish rail, a bird species found in Argentina, Bolivia, Brazil, Colombia, Ecuador, Paraguay, Peru and Venezuela
 Phaonia nigricans, Johannsen, 1916, a fly species in the genus Phaonia
 Pollimyrus nigricans, the dark stonebasher, a fish species found in Burundi, Kenya, Tanzania and Uganda
 Ponthieva nigricans, Schltr., 1917, an orchid species in the genus Ponthieva found in Ecuador
 Prochilodus nigricans, the black prochilodus, a tropical South American freshwater fish species found in the Amazon and Tocantins River basins
 Pycnonotus nigricans, the black-fronted bulbul, a songbird species found in Angola, Botswana, Lesotho, Namibia, South Africa, Eswatini, Zambia and Zimbabwe
 Pyrorchis nigricans, red beaks, or elephants' ears, an orchid species found in Australia

Synonyms
 Planorbis nigricans, a synonym for Biomphalaria glabrata, a snail species

See also
 Nigricans (disambiguation)